The 2023 Southeastern Louisiana Lions football team will represent Southeastern Louisiana University as a member of the Southland Conference during the 2023 NCAA Division I FCS football season. They are led by head coach Frank Scelfo, who was coaching his sixth season with the program. The Lions play their home games at Strawberry Stadium in Hammond, Louisiana.

Schedule

Game summaries

at Mississippi State

at South Alabama

at Eastern Washington

Houston Christian

Tarleton State

at Incarnate Word

Lamar

at Northwestern State

McNeese State

at Texas A&M–Commerce

Nicholls

Personnel

Coaching staff

Roster

Statistics

Team

Individual leaders

Defense

Key: POS: Position, SOLO: Solo Tackles, AST: Assisted Tackles, TOT: Total Tackles, TFL: Tackles-for-loss, SACK: Quarterback Sacks, INT: Interceptions, BU: Passes Broken Up, PD: Passes Defended, QBH: Quarterback Hits, FR: Fumbles Recovered, FF: Forced Fumbles, BLK: Kicks or Punts Blocked, SAF: Safeties, TD : Touchdown

Special teams

References

Southeastern Louisiana Lions
Southeastern Louisiana Lions football seasons
Southeastern Louisiana Lions